The Men's individual pursuit LC3 track cycling event at the 2008 Summer Paralympics was competed on 9 September. It was won by Simon Richardson, representing .

Qualifying

9 Sept. 2008, 09:30

Final round

9 Sept. 2008, 16:05
Gold

Bronze

References

M